All About Luv is the sixth and the first English-language studio album by the South Korean boy group Monsta X which features guest appearances from French Montana, Pitbull, and will.i.am. It was released and distributed by Epic Records on February 14, 2020. Its release was preceded by several sporadically released singles, including the songs "Who Do U Love?" featuring French Montana and "Love U". The album also ranked number five on the US Billboard 200 and number seven on the US Rolling Stone Top 200.

Background
It is a pop-oriented album with "electro-pop and R&B melodies", a noted difference from the dance music on their Korean releases. It also features the vocals of Wonho, who left the group in October 2019.

Promotion
Monsta X performed at various locations in and around Los Angeles on the day of the album's release, also holding meet-and-greet and Q&A sessions at Tower Records and The Roxy. Several events on the east coast of the United States were held on February 19 and 20—a release party at the Paramount in Huntington, New York, an appearance at the Live Nation store in Manhattan, also a performance at the Chelsea Music Hall.

Monsta X was to tour the United States throughout June and July 2020 in support of the album, but the tour was postponed due to the COVID-19 pandemic.

Critical reception

Tamar Herman of Billboard called the album a "pure blown pop album full of tracks that relay the emotions of romance" with a focus on "an overwhelming sense of sentimentality and smoothness". Jason Lipshutz of Billboard also described it as "an effective and often charming throwback to the harmonizing and hook construction of a bygone era" and as "a time machine worth returning to in recent months".

Sarah Deen, writing for Metro, said that the album "not only shakes off the 'cute' image but boots it up the backside off a cliff" while "the buzzy, EDM sound from their Korean albums has been traded in for club-friendly pop".

Reviewing the album for Variety, Jae-ha Kim wrote that while it was released on Valentine's Day, "its most powerful tracks deal with breakups and deceits" and that the album is "[f]ull of throbbing beats [and] inquisitive lyrics", adding that it's "a sleek production that seamlessly blends soulful pop with elements of hip-hop and EDM". Kim also added that "the Korean group's powerful vocal delivery doesn't get lost in translation", summarizing that with its release, the group "has proven that K-pop transcends language barriers and that's something to be happy about".

Listicles

Commercial performance
The album debuted at number five on the US Billboard 200 with 52,000 album-equivalent units, including 50,000 pure album sales on its first week. It is the group's first entry on the chart, although not their first on Billboard charts overall.

It also debuted at number seven on the US Rolling Stone Top 200 with 41,600 album-equivalent units, including 38,400 pure album sales on its first week. It is their first entry on the chart.

Track listing

Charts

Awards and nominations

See also
 List of K-pop songs on the Billboard charts
 List of K-pop albums on the Billboard charts

Notes

References

2020 albums
Epic Records albums
Monsta X albums